FC Spartak Kostroma is a Russian association football club from Kostroma, founded in 1959. The highest level it achieved in its history was second-highest Soviet First League, where it played in 1981 and 1982. In the past, the club was called Tekstilshchik Kostroma (1961–1963), Tekmash Kostroma (1964–1966) and Zvolma-Spartak Kostroma (1992). It was dissolved in the summer of 2018 due to lack of financing. For the 2022–23 season, the club was resurrected once again and entered the third-tier Russian Second League.

Coach
Dmitry Aleksandriysky

Current squad
As of 22 February 2023, according to the Second League website.

Notable players
Had international caps for their respective countries. Players whose name is listed in bold represented their countries while playing for Spartak.

Russia/USSR
 Aleksandr Shmarko
 Artyom Yenin
 Georgi Yartsev

Former USSR countries
 Sergei Avagimyan
 Vitaliy Levchenko
 Dmytro Yakovenko

References

External links
Official website

Association football clubs established in 1959
Football clubs in Russia
Sport in Kostroma
1959 establishments in Russia